"No Eternity" is a song by German recording artist Jeanette. It was written by Frank Johnes, Jeanette, Bodybrain and Wonderbra, and produced by Tom Remm and Frank Kretschmer for Jeanette's fourth album Break On Through (2003). It was released as a single on 8 March 2004 in Germany.

Formats and track listings
These are the formats and track listings of major single releases of "No Eternity".

CD single
(602498180730; Released )
"No Eternity" – 3:39
"No Eternity" (Extended mix) – 3:57
"No Eternity" (Karaoke version) – 3:38
"Rockin' on Heavens Floor" (Live acoustic version) – 4:20
"Mystery" – 3:39

Personnel
The following people contributed to "No Eternity":

Jeanette – vocals
Frank Kretschmer – production, drums, keyboards
Tom Remm – production
Jörg Weisselberg – guitar
Chris Wirsching, René Schostak – drums, keyboards

Charts

References

External links
Official website

2004 singles
Jeanette Biedermann songs
Songs written by Jeanette Biedermann
2003 songs
Universal Music Group singles
Songs written by Kristina Bach